(John) Wynford (Joshua) Rees (1924–2005) was a Welsh Anglican priest.

Rees was born in 1924 and educated at the University of Wales. He was ordained deacon in 1953, and priest in 1954. He was the incumbent at Llanyre from 1960. He was Archdeacon of Brecon from 1987 until 1994.

References

1924 births
2005 deaths
Archdeacons of Brecon
20th-century Welsh Anglican priests
Alumni of the University of Wales